Aaruthra is a 2018 Indian Tamil-language thriller film directed by Pa. Vijay, who also produced the film, wrote the songs, and played the lead role with Meghali. S. A. Chandrasekhar and Bhagyaraj portray supporting roles.

Plot
Avudaiappan (K. Bhagyaraj), a private detective, develops suspicion over Shiva (Pa. Vijay), who lives with his family in Chennai. When the latter is almost caught red-handed, he comes up with the reason why he is into killing people.

Cast 

 Pa. Vijay as Shivamalai (Shiva)
 Meghali as Parvati
 K. Bhagyaraj as Avudaiappan 
 S. A. Chandrasekhar as Shiva's father
 Meera Krishnan as Shiva's mother
 Gnanasambandham as Shiva's uncle
 Yuvasri Lakshmi as Aaruthra, Shiva's sister
 Vignesh as Nambi, Shiva's relative who betrays him
 Rajendran as Avudaiappan's assistant
 Sanjana Singh as Avudaiappan's wife
 Y. G. Mahendran as Ramanujam
 Mayilsamy

Soundtrack

Soundtrack was composed by Vidyasagar.
"Chellama" - Karthik, Varsha Ranjith 
"Paavadai" - Sanjana Kalmanje 
"Aaruthram" -Karthik, Sriram, Narayanan Ravishankar 
"Munimaa" - Sanjana Kalmanje 
"Puli Onnu" - Pa. Vijay

Reception 
A reviewer from The Times of India gave the film a rating of two out of five stars and wrote that "The messages put across in the film, highlighting the alarming child abuses, looks good on paper, but the execution falls flat". Sify wrote "Pa.Vijays intention to deliver a message against child abuse is laudable, the film fails big time in the execution part."

References

External links
 

2018 films
2010s Tamil-language films
Indian films about revenge